Kalidasa Academy is a cultural institution established by the Government of Madhya Pradesh to act as a multi-disciplinary institution, which would project the totality of classical tradition with Kalidasa as its centre. It was set up in 1978 and is located in Ujjain.

References

Ujjain
Cultural organisations based in India
Organisations based in Madhya Pradesh
Culture of Madhya Pradesh
1978 establishments in Madhya Pradesh
State agencies of Madhya Pradesh
Kalidasa
Buildings and structures in Ujjain
Organisations based in Ujjain